Petergate House (or Oratory House) is a grade II* listed building in the city centre of York, in England.

A previous building on the site was constructed about 1500, and its later owners included Thomas Herbert and Henry Swinburne.  William Turner bought it in 1723, and largely demolished it, only a single passageway surviving.  The new house was of three storeys and seven bays, with a stucco front, lined to resemble stonework, while the rear is of brick.

In the 19th-century, a new mansard roof was added, as was a two-storey semicircular bay to the rear.  The interior was also largely remodelled, and the staircase was altered and moved.  From the original fittings, several fireplaces survive, as does much of the decoration of the left-hand front room on the ground floor.  The top of the staircase includes some reused balusters from about 1700.

The building serves as the rectory for the York Oratory. It is the home of the Fathers of the Oratory and its garden is occasionally opened to the public.

See also
 York Oratory
 More House

References

External links
Official Site - York Oratory
St Wilfrid's RC School, York
Oratory of Saint Philip Neri - Procurator General (Rome)

Grade II* listed buildings in York
Houses completed in 1725
Houses in North Yorkshire
Petergate
Oratorian communities in the United Kingdom
Oratorian communities
History of York
History of Catholicism in England